Lipce is a settlement in the Municipality of Jesenice in the Upper Carniola region of Slovenia.

Its name is a contracted plural diminutive of the Slovene word lipa 'linden tree'.

References

External links
Lipce on Geopedia

Populated places in the Municipality of Jesenice